A domain hack is a domain name that suggests a word, phrase, or name when concatenating two or more adjacent levels of that domain. In this context, the word hack denotes a clever trick (as in programming), not an exploit or break-in (as in security).

Domain hacks offer the ability to produce short domain names. This makes them potentially valuable as redirectors, pastebins, base domains from which to delegate subdomains and URL shortening services.

History
On November 23, 1992,  was registered. In the 1990s, several hostnames ending in "pla.net" were active. The concept of spelling out a phrase with the parts of a hostname to form a domain hack became well established. On Friday, May 3, 2002,  was registered to create . Delicious would later gain control of the delicio.us domain, which had been parked since April 24, 2002, the day the .us ccTLD (country code top-level domain) was opened to second-level registrations.

Who.is is a whois lookup service, indicating the registered ownership information of a domain. It was established June 12, 2002 and registered to an address in Reykjavík, Iceland.

On January 14, 2004, the Christmas Island Internet Administration revoked .cx domain registration for shock site goatse.cx, a domain which used "se.cx" to form the word "sex". The domain was originally registered in 1999. Similar names had been used for parody sites such as oralse.cx or analse.cx; in some cases, .cz (Czech Republic) or .kz (Kazakhstan) are substituted for .cx.

The term domain hack was coined by Matthew Doucette on November 3, 2004 to mean "an unconventional domain name that uses parts other than the SLD (second level domain) or third level domain to create the title of the domain name."

On September 11, 2007, name servers for .me were delegated by IANA to the Government of Montenegro, with a two-year transition period for existing .yu names to be transferred to .me. One of the first steps taken in deploying .me online was to create .its.me as a domain space for personal sites. Many potential domain hacks, such as love.me and buy.me, were held back by the registry as premium names for later auction.

On December 15, 2009, Google launched its own URL shortener under the domain  using the ccTLD of Greenland. YouTube subsequently launched  using the ccTLD of Belgium. In 2015 Google used the domain hack abc.xyz for their newly launched Alphabet Inc.

Working with Bit.ly, The New York Times launched an URL shortener in late 2009 under the domain  using the ccTLD of Montserrat. The need to serve shorter URLs for Twitter was cited as a reason for the shortener.

In March 2010, National Public Radio launched its own URL shortener under the domain  using the ccTLD of Puerto Rico. The n.pr domain is currently used to link to an NPR story page by its ID and is one of the shortest possible domain hacks.

In late 2010, Apple launched a URL shortener at the domain , using the ccTLD of Spain, in a similar move to Google's goo.gl. Unlike goo.gl, which was public and could be used for any web address, itun.es is used only for iTunes Ping URL shortening.

Spotify also uses the URL Shortener , using the ccTLD of Finland, to link to artist, partners, playlists, albums and songs.

Flickr uses  with .kr being the ccTLD of South Korea., and  redirects to Taco Bell’s official website.

International names
In most cases, registration of these short domain names relies on the use of country code top-level domains (ccTLDs), each of which has a unique two-letter identifier.

For example,  makes use of the ccTLD .gs (South Georgia and the South Sandwich Islands) to spell "blogs",  makes use of the ccTLD .st (São Tomé and Príncipe) to spell "fast",  uses the .one gTLD to spell "everyone",  makes use of the ccTLD .am (Armenia) to spell the name of photo-sharing service "Instagram",  uses ccTLD .us (United States) and sharing it for subdomains with free hosting,  makes use of the ccTLD .ws (West Samoa) to spell the name of Italian newspaper "Citynews",  uses ccTLD .ly (Libya) to spell "telly" (a popular British colloquial term for television), and some of Danbooru-style imageboards that end their name with '-booru' suffix may use the ccTLD .ru (Russia) to spell their own name.

Many people use domain hacks for their name to serve their personal website.

Domain hacking is not limited to singular words. For example,  uses the ccTLD for Italy to write out "help me learn it". While there is technically no restriction, these domain hacks tend to limit themselves to using only ccTLDs that are words in-and-of-itself, such as the aforementioned Italy as well as Iceland and Montenegro

In some cases, an entire ccTLD has been re-purposed in its international marketing, such as .am (Armenia), .fm (Federated States of Micronesia), .cd (Democratic Republic of the Congo), .dj (Djibouti), and .tv (Tuvalu) for sites delivering various forms of audiovisual content.

Libya's ccTLD (.ly) has been used for English words that end with suffix "ly", such as sil.ly. Popular URL shortening services bit.ly, brief.ly, name.ly and ow.ly use this hack. In 2010, the Libyan registry suspended vb.ly, an adult oriented .ly link shortener.

Other languages
In Germany, Austria, and Switzerland the domain .ag for Antigua and Barbuda is used by corporations in the legal form of Aktiengesellschaft (commonly abbreviated as AG).

The American Samoa domain .as is popular in countries where AS or A/S (Aktieselskab/Aksjeselskap) is the legal suffix for stock-based corporations in Denmark and Norway, so companies of those countries frequently employ it.

Some organisations situated in Switzerland use TLDs to specifically refer to their canton (such as the Belgian TLD .be for the Canton of Berne).

In a similar way some organizations in the German state of Schleswig-Holstein use the .sh TLD from Saint Helena.

In Turkish, "biz" means "we", and can be used for emphasis at the end of "we are" sentences.

Family names in many Slavic languages written in internationalized variant end with ch (i.e. ). This ch comes from Slavic "ć", "č", "ч", or "ћ". Therefore, the Swiss .ch ccTLD is an option. Another use case of .ch is for English words that end in ch, e.g. tech, punch, search, crunch, rich.

Since the introduction of .eu domains (eu meaning "I" in Romanian, Galician and Portuguese), these domains have become popular in Romania, with people registering their names with the .eu extension.

In French, Italian and Portuguese, là or lá mean "there". As the .la domain (Laos) is available for second-level registration worldwide, this can be an easy way to get a short, catchy name such as "go there". In Italy some TLDs are identical to Italian Provinces' identifier, such as .to (Turin) or .tv (Treviso) and are thus extensively used for web domains in the area. The Canadian domain .ca is also trivial to use as cá or cà ("here"), respectively in Portuguese and Neapolitan, or ça ("that"), in French; however, unlike some countries, Canada's .ca registrar requires local Canadian presence to use this domain.

Hungarian domains sometimes use the Moroccan top level domain .ma (meaning "today"). The Moldovan domain, .md, is used by doctors and medical companies, such as doctors.md, after a legal fight to allow such usage outside of Moldova.

A fad amongst French-speakers was to register their names in the Niue TLD .nu, which in French and Portuguese means "nude" or "naked"; however, Niue authorities have revoked many of these domain names. The handful that remain are joke domains without actual nudity. French speakers often use the Jersey TLD .je, since "je" means "I" in French. In addition, .je is used in the Netherlands, as it can mean both "you" or "your". The addition of -je to most nouns also produces a diminutive form (e.g. huis.je, or the defunct iPhone app feest.je (feestje meaning "party").

Likewise, Dutch, Swedish, and Danish speakers sometimes use .nu, because it means "now" in these languages. The TLD is still used by many Swedish sites, as prior to 2003 it was impossible for individuals (and difficult for organizations) to register arbitrary domains under the .se TLD.

English words that end with the "rs" letters (cars, fixers, powers... etc.) provide means for another popular domain hack which utilizes the Serbian .RS domain extension.

In Russian, net (as нет, or nyet transliterated character for character) means "no" or "there isn't," so there are many domains in the format something.net (e.g. redaktora.net meaning "[there is] no editor"). There are many words ending with ga (Cyrillic: га), including some highly popular (книга/kniga meaning book, дорога/doroga meaning road). Gabon's .ga domain is free for registration, which has led to wide adoption of such domain hacks.

In Czech, Polish and Slovak, to means "it", so there are many domains using Tonga's .to in the format "do-something.to" (e.g., zrobie.to, meaning "I will do it" in the Polish language or  meaning "We will move it" as Slovak moving service). Notably, Czech file sharing service  was founded in 2007, and its name "ulož to" means "save it".

In Slovenian, si is a dative form of the reciprocal personal pronoun and a second person form of the verb to be. As .si is a Slovenian ccTLD, domain hacks are abundant. Additionally, the domain is attractive to speakers of Romance languages, because it is a conjunction, pronoun or an affirmative interjection in many. ARNES limits the use of the domain to residents and entities of Slovenia.

In Spanish and Portuguese, ar is the ending of the infinitive of many verbs, so hacks with Argentina's TLD .ar are common (e.g., meaning "to educate"). Similarly, another such verb suffix is ir, TLD of Iran.

One of the earliest commercial ISPs in Finland used the domain sci.fi — a reference to science fiction.

In Kurdish, "im" means "I am", so it's possible to make meaningful domains for personal purposes with the Isle of Man TLD .im. For example, rebaz.im would mean "Rêbaz im", which translates to "I am Rêbaz".

Some registries allow Emoji in domains, permitting the creation of emoji domains. Many browsers display these domains as punycode for security reasons.

With the rise of new TLDs, some companies have registered entire TLDs in order to create a hack for their name. Most prominent is .gle, created for Google to be used as goo.gle.

See also
Country code top-level domain
Generic top-level domain

References

 
Domain Name System